Martina Crippa (born March 31, 1989) is an Italian basketball player for Gesam Gas Lucca and the Italian national team.

She participated at the EuroBasket Women 2017.

References

1989 births
Living people
Italian women's basketball players
People from Sesto San Giovanni
Point guards
Sportspeople from the Metropolitan City of Milan